The 1987 Sharjah Cup was held in Sharjah, UAE, between April 2–10, 1987. Four national teams took part: Australia, England, India and Pakistan,

The 1987 Sharjah Cup was a round-robin tournament where each team played the other once in a tournament where each team played the other once.

England won the tournament and UK£18,750 in prize money.

Matches

Table

See also
 Sharjah Cup

References

 
 Cricket Archive: Sharjah Cup 1986/87
 ESPNCricinfo: Sharjah Cup, 1986/87
 

International cricket competitions from 1985–86 to 1988
Sharjah Cup, 1987
1987 in Emirati sport
International cricket competitions in the United Arab Emirates